Charles Newcomen (1707 – 1772) was an Anglo-Irish politician.

Newcomen sat in the Irish House of Commons as the Member of Parliament for St Johnstown, County Longford, between 1761 and his death in 1772.

References

1707 births
1772 deaths
18th-century Anglo-Irish people
Irish MPs 1761–1768
Irish MPs 1769–1776
Members of the Parliament of Ireland (pre-1801) for County Longford constituencies
Newcomen family